Leuville Cemetery (also known as Leuville sur Orge Communal Cemetery) is in the French town  of Leuville-sur-Orge, 25 km south of Paris. The cemetery is a burial ground to many prominent Georgian political emigres who had left country after the Soviet invasion of Georgia of 1921. Among them are the members of the Government of the Democratic Republic of Georgia in Exile.

Notable people buried at Leuville-sur-Orge
 Razhden Arsenidze, Georgian minister
 Akaki Chkhenkeli, Georgian minister
 Kakutsa Cholokashvili, National Hero of Georgia (until 2005)
 Evgeni Gegechkori, Georgian minister
 Vlasa Mgeladze, Georgian politician
 Noe Ramishvili, president of first Georgian government
 Grigol Robakidze, Georgian writer and public figure
 Kalistrate Salia, Georgian historian and politician
 Irakli Tsereteli, Georgian minister
 Mikheil Tsereteli, Georgian historian and politician
 Grigol Uratadze, Georgian politician
 Noe Zhordania, president of second and third Georgian governments
 Vladimer Goguadze, Georgian military figure, participant of the revolutionary movement in the Caucasus. Commander of the armored trains of the Georgian People's Guard in 1918–1921. He had the title of "Hero of the Republic" (1918).

Notes

Sources 
 Georgian and French documents from Nametia Goguadze, Nikoloz Oragvelidze and Victor Nozadze (1971), Prof. Jean Bret and his students (2000), Luka Melua (2004).
 (French) Le "carré géorgien" du cimetière communal de Leuville-sur-Orge.
 

Cemeteries in Île-de-France
Georgian Soviet Socialist Republic